is a 2000 Japanese horror anthology film directed by Mamoru Hoshi, Masayuki Ochiai, Hisao Ogura and Masayuki Suzuki.  Each story is of a different genre - "One Snowy Night" (horror), "Samurai Cellular" (comedy-drama), "Chess" (thriller) and "The Marriage Simulator" (romance-drama). It is the special film version of the long-running TV drama series of the same name.

Writing credits 

 Tomoko Aizawa, segment The Marriage Simulator	
 Ryoichi Kimizuka, segment Samurai Cellular
 Motoki Nakamura, segment Chess
 Masayuki Ochiai and Katsuhide Suzuki, segment One Snowy Night

Cast 
The Storyteller
 Tamori as the storyteller
 Kōji Yamamoto as a young man
 Ryuta Sato
 Kazuyuki Aijima
 Isao Yatsu as an old man
 Bokuzō Masana

One Snowy Night
 Akiko Yada as Misa Kihara
 Kazuma Suzuki as Takuro Yuki
 Akira Takarada as Haruomi Manabe
 Ren Osugi as Yoshiaki Yamauchi
 Mami Nakamura as Mari Kondō

The Marriage Simulator
 Izumi Inamori as Chiharu Takajo
 Takashi Kashiwabara as Yuichi Tokunagi
 Narumi Kayashima
 Kazuyuki Asano
 Saya Takagi
 Yukiya Kitamura
 Manami Konishi
 Hozumi Gōda

Chess
 Shinji Takeda as Akira Kato
 Renji Ishibashi as Old Man
 Masahiro Kōmoto as Seiichi Tomoda
 Yukiko Okamoto as Kumi Kato
 Chiharu Kawai
 Shōei

Samurai Cellular
 Kiichi Nakai as Ōishi Kuranosuke
 Megumi Okina as Karu
 Keiko Toda as Riku
 Norito Yashima as the operator
 Ryo Katsuji as Ōishi Chikara
 Kairi Narita as Horibe Yasubee

References

Footnotes

General sources

External links 
 
 KFCC review

2000 films
Japanese horror anthology films
Films directed by Masayuki Ochiai
2000 horror films
Films with screenplays by Kôki Mitani
Films scored by Toshihiko Sahashi
Films based on television series
2000s Japanese films